The light novel series Full Metal Panic! is written by Shoji Gatoh and illustrated by Shiki Douji. It was serialized by Fujimi Shobo in its monthly magazine Gekkan Dragon Magazine since September 9, 1998 and published under their Fujimi Fantasia Bunko imprint. Gatoh often found delays in writing of the novels, which led to delays in the publication of the series' volumes. The series focuses on Sergeant Sousuke Sagara's arrival to the Jindai High School where he was assigned to protect the student Kaname Chidori while also acting as a student.

A total of twelve volumes have also been released from September 18, 1998 to August 20, 2010. In parallel to the twelve volumes, eleven standalone light novels of the series have also been published starting on December 17, 1998. In contrast to the regular series, these light novels focus on the comedy elements from the series. In January 2010, Gatoh wrote another of these stories in celebration of Gekkan Dragon Magazines 300th issue. Another series of spin-off novels known as Full Metal Panic! Another was released by Naoto Ōguro from August 20, 2011 to February 20, 2016 consisting of thirteen volumes and is set years after the original series' ending. The light novels have also been adapted into various manga, as well as four anime television series for which Gatoh was also part of the staff.

Tokyopop licensed the Full Metal Panic! series for North America release, publishing the first regular light novel on September 11, 2007. The latest released volume is the fourth on February 1, 2011 which is a compilation from the original fourth and fifth volumes from the series.
The main 12 light novels were re-licensed by J-Novel Club in March 2019. On July 1, 2022, J-Novel announced that they were translating the short stories.

Full Metal Panic! novel list

Novels

Short stories

Side stories

Full Metal Panic! Another novel list

Novels

Short stories

References

Full Metal Panic!
Full Metal Panic!